Nadia Raj were a dynasty of Zamindars and the rulers of territories that are now part of the Nadia district region of West Bengal, India. Their seat was at the city of Krishnanagar, Nadia.

The rulers of Nadia Raj established many Sanskrit schools in Nadia, since they were the patron of Sanskrit literature and music. They were also patrons of Sanskrit culture in Bengal.

History
The Nadia Raj family is believed to have descended from Bhatta Narayana, who was a Brahmin of the Sandilya Gotra. He was summoned from Kanyakubja (Kannauj) by Raja Adisura of Bengal, for the conduct of ceremonies of purification.

The Nadia Raj family is one of the oldest Hindu families in Bengal, spanning more than 35 generations from the founder. Since the establishment of British rule in Bengal each of the Rajas of Nadia were created a Maharaja Bahadur in succession.

References

Hindu families
Bengali families
Indian families
Bengali zamindars
Zamindari estates
Bengali Hindus
Indian nobility
Indian noble families